The Wittemann-Lewis Training Tractor (sometimes referred to as the T-T) is an American two-seat military training biplane designed and built by the Wittemann-Lewis Aircraft Company.

Design
The Training Tractor was designed as a military training biplane, a conventional tractor biplane with two-open cockpits in tandem. It had a square section fuselage and a conventional landing gear with a tailskid. The Training Tractor was powered by a  Hall-Scott A-7 engine mounted in the nose. It was not ordered into production.

Specifications

References

Notes

1910s United States military trainer aircraft
Training Tractor
Single-engined tractor aircraft
Biplanes
Aircraft first flown in 1918